XHDFM-FM is a radio station in Mexico City. Broadcasting on 106.5 MHz, XHDFM-FM is owned by Grupo ACIR and broadcasts contemporary music in English from the 1980s to the present under the name 106.5 MIX.

History
The concession for 106.5 MHz in Mexico City was awarded in 1964 to México Radio, S.A., for XHMR-FM. Not long after, the station's callsign was changed to XHABC-FM, reflecting the station's then-common ownership with XEABC-AM 760. The station was sold to Fórmula Melódica in 1977 and the callsign changed to the current XHDFM-FM. Fórmula Melódica, owned by the Guadalajara-based Ondas de Alegría group, broadcast romantic and ranchera music in Spanish until 1981, when it became "La Nueva Onda" and changed its format to ballad music. The station moved studios in 1985 after its previous facilities were heavily damaged by the 1985 Mexico City earthquake.

In 1986, Ondas de Alegría was dissolved and Grupo ARTSA took over operation. The station's name was changed again, to "Stereo Amor", and then in 1992 to "Amor 106", both times with a romantic music format. In 1995, XHDFM and its sisters were sold to Grupo ACIR, who changed the station to its current name and format, which had been created a year earlier on XHSH-FM.

References

Radio stations established in 1964
Radio stations in Mexico City
Grupo ACIR